Kenneth Ray Carllile (April 2, 1931–July 31, 1987), better known as Thumbs Carllile (Carlisle in some collections), was an American country music guitarist and songwriter known for his innovative zither-like fingerstyle playing, sitting with his guitar in his lap while fretting, picking and strumming with his fingers and thumbs. He performed with Little Jimmy Dickens at the Grand Ole Opry in the early 1950s, and was a member of Roger Miller's band from 1964 to 1972.

Biography

Kenneth Carllile was born April 2, 1931 in St. Louis, Missouri and grew up on his impoverished father's tenant farm in Harrisburg, Illinois. At age eight he began playing a Dobro resonator guitar won by his sister Evelyn, and after she hid the steel bar, Carllile began using his thumbs. When his father gave him a Silvertone guitar, his small thumb and fingers were too short to make it around the neck, so he played it on his lap like the Dobro.

Early career

In 1941, Carllile's family moved to Granite City, Illinois, and he later made his debut playing "Sweet Georgia Brown" at a Ferlin Husky concert at the Music Box Club in East St. Louis. He was expelled from high school at 16 for refusing to shave, and instead performed with Husky until he was discovered by Little Jimmy Dickens in 1949 during a St. Louis appearance. He joined Dickens' Country Boys after demonstrating he could play both parts of Dickens' twin guitar lines. Dickens gave him the nickname Thumbs, which Carllile never embraced. He played with the group until 1952, including performances at the Grand Ole Opry.

From 1952–54, Carllile served in the US Army, performing with its Special Services division. He was stationed in Stuttgart, Germany where he met and married another servicemember, singer-songwriter Virginia Boyle, in 1955. After his discharge, Carllile regularly appeared on ABC-TV's Ozark Jubilee in Springfield, Missouri from 1956–57, both as a soloist and with Bill Wimberley's Country Rhythm Boys. They released Springfield Guitar Social on Starday in 1958. In the late 50s, he and Virginia performed in Billings, Montana and appeared on KOOK-TV.

In 1961, Carllile met guitarist Les Paul, who was impressed by Carllile's skill and his wife's songwriting, and they recorded enough tracks for two albums at Paul's home studio in Mahwah, New Jersey. Later that year, Carllile (as Thumbs Carlyle) released a duet on Epic with his wife Virginia (as Ginny O'Boyle), "Indian Girl, Indian Boy".

With Roger Miller

In 1963, Carllile joined the Wade Ray Five, and Ray's Las Vegas band, but left the following year to join Roger Miller's band, where he stayed until 1972. He appeared on Miller's 1966 NBC-TV show, and performed with him five times on NBC's Tonight Show during the 1960s. He also appeared at the Grammy Awards when Miller swept the country categories in 1964 with "Dang Me", and in 1965 with "King of the Road" (1965), for which Carllile provided the song's signature finger snaps.

Miller helped him sign with Smash Records, where he released two albums, Roger Miller Presents Thumbs Carllile and All Thumbs in 1965. He released several singles for Smash, including "My Bossa Nova/Candy Girl" (1966). Several tracks he recorded for the label were popular but did not chart, including "Let it Be Me", "Caravan", "No Yesterday", "Theme from Picnic", "Blue Skies", "Stranger On The Shore" and "Hold It". In 1968, Carllile signed with Capitol and recorded the album Walking in Guitar Land.

Later years

In 1986, he moved from Chattanooga, Tennessee to Decatur, Georgia, where Virginia worked in a factory making springs. Carllile underwent surgery that year for colon cancer, which, despite fundraisers, left the family bankrupt. After recovering, he played with his trio, The Indecent 3; performed on Sagebrush Boogie, a weekly program on Atlanta's  WRFG-FM; and was a regular at such venues as the Freight Room in Decatur and The Point.

In late July 1987, Carllile suffered a mild heart attack while driving back to Decatur from Chattanooga with his newest release. He was preparing to perform as the regular opening act for guitarist Michael Hedges when he died on July 31. He was buried in Decatur Cemetery.

Family

Carllile's two daughters are also musicians: Kathy Carllile is a blues singer in Atlanta, Georgia who once led Kathy Carllile and Tabasco, and had a minor hit with "Stay Until the Rain Stops" in 1986 on the Frontline label. She and Carllile were once winners on The Gong Show.

Tammy Carllile sang in the Cowboy Boogie Band in Las Vegas and won Nashville's Hall of Fame singing competition; and also sang vocals on albums with her father.  Her two sons, Joseph Carllile and Daniel Guidry, are musicians and aspire to make a career of it.

Notes

References

External links
Thumbs Carllile's official Web site
Thumbs Carllile discography

1931 births
1987 deaths
Musicians from St. Louis
American country guitarists
American male guitarists
American country singer-songwriters
American session musicians
Fingerstyle guitarists
20th-century American guitarists
20th-century American singers
Singer-songwriters from Missouri
People from Harrisburg, Illinois
Guitarists from Missouri
Country musicians from Georgia (U.S. state)
Country musicians from Illinois
Country musicians from Missouri
20th-century American male musicians
American male singer-songwriters
Singer-songwriters from Illinois